Caleb Clarke may refer to:

Caleb Clarke (soccer), Canadian soccer player
Caleb Clarke (rugby union), New Zealand rugby union player